The High Commissioner of the United Kingdom to Uganda is the United Kingdom's foremost diplomatic representative in the Republic of Uganda, and head of the UK's diplomatic mission in Uganda.

They work primarily from the British High Commission Kampala.

As fellow members of the Commonwealth of Nations, the United Kingdom and Uganda conduct their diplomatic relations at governmental level, rather than between Heads of State. Therefore, the countries exchange High Commissioners, rather than ambassadors.

High Commissioners to Uganda
1962–1965: David Hunt
1965–1967: Roland Hunt
1967–1970: David Scott
1970–1972: Richard Slater
1972–1973: Henry Brind
1973–1976: James Hennessy
1976–1979: (no High Commissioner) 
1979:         Richard Posnett
1979–1980: Bertram Flack
1980–1983: Norman Hillier-Fry
1983–1986: Colin McLean
1986–1989: Derek March
1989–1993: Charles Cullimore
1993–1997: Edward Clay
1997–2000: Michael Cook
2000–2002: Tom Phillips
2002–2005: Adam Wood
2005–2008: Francois Gordon
2008–2012: Martin Shearman
2012–2016: Alison Blackburne
2016–2020 Peter West

2020-: Kate Airey

External links
UK and Uganda, gov.uk

References

Uganda
 
United Kingdom